HMS Seraph was an  destroyer, which served with the Royal Navy during the Russian Civil War. The S class were a development of the previous , with minor differences, constructed at the end of the First World War. Seraph had a career as an evacuation vessel more than as a warship. Launched in 1918 by Denny, Seraph was originally destined for the Grand Fleet but, after the Armistice, the destroyer transferred to the Mediterranean Fleet based at Malta. The destroyer was sent into the Black Sea to support the White Russian forces in their fight against the Communists. The role involved supporting the movement of troops rather than firing at the enemy. Ultimately, the Communists won and Seraph helped the evacuation of White Russian troops from Crimea, returning to Malta in 1921. The destroyer was then stationed in the Eastern Mediterranean in 1923 in response to the tensions in Turkey. In 1927, the ship was sent to Hong Kong to serve under the Commander-in-Chief, China. In 1929, the vessel was once again called to evacuate, this time Christian missionaries from the Chinese Red Army. Once again, the evacuation took place without bloodshed. With the introduction of more modern destroyers, the Royal Navy started retiring the S class and, in 1934, Seraph was sold to be broken up.

Design and development

Seraph was one of thirty-three Admiralty  destroyers ordered by the British Admiralty on 7 April 1917 as part of the Eleventh War Construction Programme. Differences with the R class were minor, such as having the searchlight moved aft.

Two funnels were fitted.

Armament consisted of three QF  Mk IV guns on the ship's centreline.  One was mounted raised on the forecastle, one on a platform between the funnels and one aft. The ship also mounted a single 2-pounder  "pom-pom" anti-aircraft gun for air defence. Four  torpedo tubes were carried in two twin rotating mounts aft. Four depth charge chutes were also fitted aft. Typically ten depth charges were carried. The ship was designed to mount two additional  torpedo tubes either side of the superstructure but this required the forecastle plating to be cut away, making the vessel very wet, so they were removed. The weight saved enabled the heavier Mark V 21-inch torpedo to be carried. Fire control included a training-only director, single Dumaresq and a Vickers range clock. The ship had a complement of 90 officers and ratings.

Construction and career
Laid down on 10 October 1917 by William Denny and Brothers in Dumbarton with the yard number 1099, Seraph was launched on 8 July the following year.  The vessel was the first with the name to serve in the Royal Navy, and the second of six of the class to be built by the yard. Seraph was completed on 25 December shortly after the Armistice that ended the First World War. The vessel was destined to join the Fourteenth Destroyer Flotilla of the Grand Fleet. However, with the dissolution of the Grand Fleet as the Royal Navy adjusted to peacetime operations, Seraph joined the Sixth Destroyer Flotilla of the Mediterranean Fleet and was transferred to Malta.

Increasing awareness of the conflicts in the region, both the Greco-Turkish War and the Russian Civil War, meant that the Royal Navy transferred a number of warships into the Black Sea to assist the evacuation efforts. Seraph was sent to Crimea to support the White Russian forces, arriving in the Sea of Azov with sister ship  in time to support their attack on Mariupol. On 29 June 1919, Seraph assisted the Russian cruiser  in the landing 300 Russian troops that captured Koktebel. The destroyer was then posted to Feodosia arriving on 4 July. Three days later, Seraph was sent to Constantinople to support the peaceful dissolution of the Ottoman Empire.

As it became increasingly clear that the White Russians had lost the war, the ship was also involved in the evacuation of the Crimea. The vessel carried over typically 300 troops at a time, helping to rescue 5,500 people in one night, on 26 March 1920, and was involved in the evacuation of Sevastopol on 11 November. The destroyer returned to Malta on 9 February 1921. However, increasing tension between the new Greek and Turkish states meant the navy built up forces in the Eastern Mediterranean. Seraph was sent to Chanak along with three other destroyers under the flotilla leader . Returning to Malta on 3 May 1923 for a respite, the destroyer returned to the area 21 days later. With the signing of the Treaty of Lausanne on 24 July, the Mediterranean Fleet was able to be reduced and the destroyers returned to UK waters. On 4 December, Seraph was placed in the Reserve Fleet at Devonport.

On 7 January 1927, the destroyer was recommissioned with a full complement and left on 8 February to join the Eighth Destroyer Flotilla, operating under the Commander-in-Chief, China. By 4 June, the destroyer had joined a multinational force, with warships from the Japanese and US Navies, based in Nanking, in the aftermath of the Nanking incident. On 1 October 1929, the vessel was recommissioned, having arrived in Hong Kong. On 26 December, the destroyer was called upon to sail to Shanwei to evacuate Christian missionaries threatened by the advancing Chinese Red Army. Taking the Apostolic vicar, Enrico Valtorta, as an interpreter, Seraph arrived the following day, and set a cutter to negotiate, containing Valtorta and fifty soldiers, under a flag of truce. The negotiations were successful and no shots were fired.

On 22 April 1930, the London Naval Treaty was signed, which limited total destroyer tonnage in the Royal Navy. The force was looking to introduce more modern destroyers and so needed to retire some of the older vessels. Seraph was retired and, on 7 May 1934, sold to Thos. W. Ward to be broken up at Pembroke Dock.

Pennant numbers

References

Citations

Bibliography

 
 
 
 
 
 
 
 
 
 
 

1918 ships
S-class destroyers (1917) of the Royal Navy
Ships built on the River Clyde
World War I destroyers of the United Kingdom